Garet may refer to:

 Jedd Garet (born 1955), American sculptor
 Garet Garrett (1878–1954), American journalist
 Garet Jax, a fictional character
 Garet, character in Golden Sun role-playing games